The 1956 Kansas State Wildcats football team represented Kansas State University in the 1956 NCAA University Division football season.  The team's head football coach was Bus Mertes, in his second year at the helm of the Wildcats.  The Wildcats played their home games in Memorial Stadium.  The Wildcats finished the season with a 3–7 record with a 2–4 record in conference play.  They finished tied for fifth place in the Big Seven Conference.  The Wildcats scored 110 points and gave up 192 points.

Schedule

References

Kansas State
Kansas State Wildcats football seasons
Kansas State Wildcats football